Bollywood Hero was an American television miniseries that aired on the IFC in three parts on August 6–8, 2009. The miniseries were shot in Mumbai and Los Angeles.

The show is a musical miniseries about Chris Kattan and his journey to Mumbai to become a leading man in Bollywood. After having some successful runs as a comedian in America, Kattan wishes for more and soon discovers that making it in Bollywood is just as hard and he has to start from scratch.

Dance numbers are choreographed by Longinus Fernandes who is known for the "Jai Ho" finale in Slumdog Millionaire.

Characters

Major characters

Cameos
Gaurav Ghatnekar as Hipster Partygoer
Maya Rudolph as herself
Keanu Reeves as himself
David Alan Grier as himself
Longinus Fernandes as himself

International Broadcasting

: +Globosat

External links

2000s American comedy television miniseries
2009 American television series debuts
2009 American television series endings
Bollywood in fiction
IFC (American TV channel) original programming
Television shows set in Mumbai
Television shows set in Los Angeles